The Tomb of the Unknown Warrior is part of the New Zealand National War Memorial on Buckle Street, Wellington.

On 6 November 2004, the remains of an unknown New Zealand soldier were exhumed from the (CWGC) Caterpillar Valley Cemetery, and laid to rest in the Tomb of the Unknown Warrior in Wellington, New Zealand. He represents over 18,000 members of New Zealand forces who lost their lives during the First World War. A special headstone marks his original resting place in Plot 14, Row A, Grave 27.

History
On 6 November 2004 the remains, in a copper coffin sealed and placed in a rimu coffin brought from New Zealand, were handed over from the care of the Commonwealth War Graves Commission to a New Zealand delegation during a ceremony at Longueval, Somme, France. New Zealand Defence Force chief, Air Marshal Bruce Ferguson, who had the task of repatriating the Warrior's remains, said of the occasion "I told him [the Warrior] we're taking him home and that those who are taking him home are soldiers, sailors and airmen, past and present. I asked the Warrior to be the guardian of all military personnel who had died on active service. I then promised that we, the people of New Zealand, will be his guardian for ever".

The Warrior arrived in New Zealand on 10 November 2004. While he lay in state in the Parliament Buildings an estimated 10,000 people paid their respects. The Warrior was laid to rest on the 86th Armistice Day, 11 November 2004, after a service at St Paul's Anglican Cathedral and a 2.85 km slow march procession through the streets of Wellington, lined by about 100,000 people. The Tomb was sealed with a bronze mantel at 3:59pm, bearing the words:

The Warrior is one of more than 1500 New Zealanders killed on the Somme. Most of them, 1272, remained unidentified and are buried in unmarked graves or remembered on memorial walls. The remains are thought to include an almost complete skeleton, and other belongings that established beyond doubt the Warrior's nationality.

Awards
The Warrior was awarded:
 1914–15 Star for service between August 1914 and December 1915
 British War Medal for service during World War I up to 1920
 Victory Medal
 1939–1945 Star for service during World War II
 New Zealand Operational Service Medal

The Royal New Zealand Returned and Services' Association also awarded its Badge in Gold, the first time it has been awarded posthumously. Immediate Past National President David Cox, a World War II veteran, made the presentation:

Each RNZRSA District President placed soil and other items into the Tomb to acknowledge the service personnel from their districts who had given their lives to the nation, including soil from the farm of Charles Upham. Soil from Caterpillar Valley Cemetery was provided by the Ambassador from France, Jean-Michel Marlaud.

External links
 National War Memorial of New Zealand
 A Day to Remember: The Story of the Tomb of the Unknown Warrior

Tomb of the Unknown Warrior
Tomb of the Unknown Warrior
Tomb of the Unknown Warrior
Tomb of the Unknown Warrior
Tomb of the Unknown Warrior
Art and cultural repatriation
Tomb of the Unknown Warrior
Tourist attractions in Wellington City
Tombs of Unknown Soldiers